The Junior women's race at the 1989 IAAF World Cross Country Championships was held in Stavanger, Norway, at the Scanvest Ring on March 19, 1989.   A report on the event was given in the Glasgow Herald.

Complete results, medallists, 
 and the results of British athletes were published.

Race results

Junior women's race (4 km)

Individual

Teams

Note: Athletes in parentheses did not score for the team result

Participation
An unofficial count yields the participation of 114 athletes from 27 countries in the Junior women's race.  This is in agreement with the official numbers as published.

 (6)
 (4)
 (3)
 (1)
 (6)
 (1)
 (5)
 (6)
 (5)
 (5)
 (5)
 (5)
 (4)
 (5)
 (1)
 (6)
 (6)
 (5)
 (6)
 (6)
 (1)
 (3)
 (2)
 (6)
 (6)
 (1)
 (4)

See also
 1989 IAAF World Cross Country Championships – Senior men's race
 1989 IAAF World Cross Country Championships – Junior men's race
 1989 IAAF World Cross Country Championships – Senior women's race

References

Junior women's race at the World Athletics Cross Country Championships
IAAF World Cross Country Championships
1989 in women's athletics
1989 in youth sport